HMCS Haida is a  that served in the Royal Canadian Navy (RCN) from 1943 to 1963, participating in World War II and the Korean War. She was named for the Haida people.

The only surviving Tribal-class destroyer out of 27 vessels constructed for the RCN, the Royal Navy, and the Royal Australian Navy between 1937 and 1945, Haida sank more enemy surface tonnage than any other Canadian warship and as such is commonly referred to as the "Fightingest Ship in the Royal Canadian Navy".

In 2018, Haida was designated the ceremonial flagship of the RCN.

Design and description
The Tribals were designed to fight heavily armed destroyers of other navies, such as the Japanese . Canada chose the design based on its armament, with the size and power of the Tribal class allowing them to act more like small cruisers than as fleet destroyers. Haida was among the first batch of Tribal-class destroyers ordered by the RCN in 1940–1941. They were ordered with modified ventilation and heating systems for North Atlantic winter service. Haidas design was modified after deficiencies were noted in the lead ship of the Canadian Tribals, .

Haida had a complement of 14 officers and 245 ratings.

The destroyer was propelled by two shafts driven by two Parsons geared turbines powered by steam created by three Admiralty-type three-drum boilers. The destroyers could carry  of fuel oil.

As built, Haida was fitted with six quick-firing  Mk XII guns placed in three twin turrets, designated 'A', 'B' and 'Y' from bow to stern. The turrets were placed on 40° mountings with open-backed shields. The ship also had one twin turret of QF  Mk XVI guns in the 'X' position. For secondary anti-aircraft armament, the destroyer was equipped with four single-mounted 2-pounder "pom-pom" guns. The vessel was also fitted with four  torpedo tubes for Mk IX torpedoes.

Construction and career
Haidas keel was laid down by Vickers-Armstrongs, Ltd. at their shipyard in Newcastle-upon-Tyne on 29 September 1941 with the yard number 41. The destroyer was launched on 25 August 1942 and commissioned into RCN service on 30 August 1943. She underwent workups under her first commanding officer, H.G. DeWolf before reporting to the British Home Fleet at Scapa Flow in October 1943.

After commissioning Haida was assigned to the Royal Navy's Home Fleet. On 15 November the convoy JW 54A sailed from Loch Ewe. Haida was among the destroyers that joined the escort from 18 to 24 November 1943. On 28 November Haida was among the destroyer escort for the Russian convoy RA 54B, protecting it until it reached Loch Ewe on 9 December without loss. The convoy JW 55B sailed from Loch Ewe for Russia on 20 December. Haida was a member of its ocean escort. The  was deployed to intercept the convoy. While the cruisers escorting the convoy kept the German vessel at bay, Haida and the other escorting destroyers shepherded the convoy away from danger until the German battleship was sunk by a British force. On 23 December the convoy was attacked by Junkers Ju 88 bombers, but escaped unscathed. Haida joined the escort of RA 55B on the return journey to the UK which sailed from Kola Inlet on 31 December and arrived on 8 January 1944.

Operations along the French coast 
On 10 January 1944, she was reassigned to the 10th Destroyer Flotilla at Plymouth and took part in the Operation Tunnel and Operation Hostile sweeps in the Bay of Biscay and along the French coast of the English Channel. By April, Haida had sailed on nineteen of the Operation Tunnel/Hostile missions.

Despite the German designation as 'torpedo boat', the Elbings were essentially on a par with mid-sized Allied destroyers having just slightly smaller armament. T27 was hit early and retired to Morlaix while Haida sank T29 and T24 was damaged before making St. Malo.

On the night of 28/29 April T24 and T27 attempted to move from St. Malo to Brest and encountered the destroyers Athabaskan and Haida off St. Brieux, which were performing a covering sweep as part of Operation Hostile. Athabaskan was torpedoed and sunk in the engagement. T24 is credited with the sinking the ship. Haida ran T27 aground and set the vessel afire with shelling. The torpedo boat was later destroyed by MTB 673. Of the Athabaskans crew 128 were lost, 44 survivors were recovered by Haida and 83 survivors became prisoners of war of the Germans and were brought to France.

Haida continued the Operation Hostile sorties in company of sister ship Huron during the weeks leading up to Operation Overlord. The 10th Destroyer Flotilla were part of the covering force for surface attacks at the western entrance of the English Channel during the invasion of Normandy. On 8–9 June, Haida was part of Task Force 26 which engaged the German 8th Destroyer Flotilla, comprising Z32, Z24,  and T24 northwest of the Île de Bas. Haida and Huron combined to sink Z32 in the Battle of Ushant. Following the fall of Cherbourg, the German E-boats were transferred to Le Havre, freeing up the 10th Flotilla. The flotilla was then given the dual role of covering Allied motor torpedo boat flotillas and search and sink missions against German shipping along the French coast.

On 24 June, while on patrol in the English Channel off Land's End, investigated a 311th Squadron's Liberator bomber dropping depth charges on a target. Haida and the British destroyer  began their own depth charge attacks after being informed that a submarine had been spotted. After several attacks, the submarine surfaced and attempted to run. Haida and Eskimo began to fire with all their guns and sank . Haida rescued six survivors of the sunken submarine. On 14/15 July 1944, Haida and  intercepted a group of German ships in the Île de Groix area near Lorient. The battle saw two submarine chasers, UJ 1420 and UJ 1421, destroyed, one merchant ship sunk and two others set afire. On 5–6 August, Haida was part of a force engaged in an Operation Kinetic sweep. The force attacked a German convoy north of the Île de Yeu and sank the minesweepers M 263 and M 486, the patrol boat V 414 and the coastal launch Otto. During the battle a shell exploded in one of Haidas turrets and started a fire, killing two and injuring eight, knocking the turret out of action. Staying in the line of battle, the destroyers were engaged by shore batteries when they attempted to take on a second convoy and were forced to withdraw without doing much damage to the German merchant vessels.

Refit and northern operations 
Haida departed Western Europe on 22 September for Halifax, Nova Scotia, arriving on 29 September. The destroyer returned to Scapa Flow in mid-January 1945 after refitting to receive new radar. On 19 March Haida escorted aircraft carriers in minelaying operations off Granesund, Norway and assisted in attacks on shipping off Trondheim from 24 to 28 March. On 7 April, Haida escorted seven anti-submarine warfare vessels from Greenock, Scotland destined for Soviet use at Vaenga, on the Kola Inlet.
The destroyer was among the escort for convoy JW 66 that set out from the River Clyde on 16 April. Haida experienced one of the last RCN engagements of the Second World War when she escorted convoy RA 66 from Vaenga from 29 April to 2 May. The convoy was attacked in transit and Haida and Huron received near-misses from torpedoes fired by U-boats. In the skirmish, two U-boats were sunk, along with the frigate , and the convoy escaped in a snowstorm. Haida and Huron returned to Scapa Flow on 6 May and were assigned to relief operations at Trondheimsfjord, Norway on 17 May. From 29 to 31 May, Haida, Huron, the cruiser  and the 5th Escort Group were sent to Trondheim to take over custody of surrendered U-boats.

Haida, along with Huron and Iroquois, left for Halifax on 4 June to refit as part of Canada's contribution to Operation Downfall. They arrived on 10 June and Haida started a tropicalization refit but it was suspended after the surrender of Japan later that summer. Haida was paid off on 20 March 1946.

Cold War operations 

Haida was in inactive reserve for approximately one year but was prepared for reactivation in 1947 and underwent a refit for updated armament and sensors. This involved replacing the main armament, with the 4.7-inch guns removed and two twin Mk XVI 4-inch gun mounts installed forward and a twin /50 calibre gun mount installed aft. The ship was given a Mk 63 fire control director for its guns. One turret was completely removed and replaced by two Squid anti-submarine mortars placed on the quarterdeck. A short aluminum mast was installed and the funnels were fitted with caps.

Haida was equipped with Type 275, SPS-10, SPS-6, Type 293 and 262 radars and Type 140 and 174 sonars. While in refit, fire gutted the wheelhouse and boiler tubes burst later during speed trials. She returned to the fleet, still carrying the pennant number G63, in May 1947.

Haida and her sister ship  participated in exercises between the RCN's Atlantic Fleet and the United States Navy and Royal Navy over the next several years and were the first RCN ships to penetrate Hudson Bay in Fall 1948. In November 1949, Haida rescued the 18 members of the crew of a United States Air Force B-29 bomber that crashed in the Atlantic Ocean. That December, Haida was downgraded to a depot and accommodation ship in Halifax.

The opening of the Korean War on 25 June 1950 saw Haida once again activated for war duty. She was converted to a destroyer escort and began refit in July 1950 which saw various new armaments and sensors and communications systems. She was recommissioned on 15 March 1952 and carried the pennant DDE 215. She departed Halifax on 27 September for Sasebo, Japan, arriving there on 6 November after passing through the Panama Canal.

Haida relieved Nootka on 18 November off the west coast of Korea and had an uneventful patrol performing aircraft carrier screening and inshore patrol missions, returning to Sasebo to replenish on 29 November. She patrolled off the east coast of Korea beginning on 4 December and took part with the destroyer escort  in shelling of a railway yard in Songjin as well as a coastal battery and North Korean troops. On 18–19 December, Haida attacked an enemy train but missed the escaping locomotive which hid in a nearby tunnel, thus not joining the exclusive "Trainbusters Club". Haida returned to patrol on 3 January 1953 and escorted aircraft carriers as well as performing coastal bombardments. On 29 January, Haida entered the "Trainbusters Club" after attacking a train north of Riwon. The destroyer eliminated a second train on 26 May and also detonated a drifting anti-ship mine on her return to Paengyang-do. She departed Sasebo on 12 June, heading west through the Suez Canal and arrived in Halifax on 22 July 1953.

Haida departed Halifax for a second Korean tour on 14 December 1953, passing through the Panama Canal and arriving in theatre on 5 February 1954. Despite the cease fire, infractions by North Korea and China were occurring, thus the need for a naval presence around South Korea. The destroyer departed the Korean theatre on 12 September 1954 and headed for Halifax via the Suez Canal once again, arriving on 1 November.

Following the Korean operations, Haida embarked on Cold War anti-submarine warfare duties with other NATO units in the North Atlantic and West Indies. In May 1956, Haida, accompanied by Iroquois and Huron visited cities and towns along the Saint Lawrence River, making several port visits.

Haidas aging hull and infrastructure proved troublesome and in January 1958 she went into refit for hull repairs and protection for electronic equipment. Further refits in 1959 corrected various problems and she sailed for the West Indies in January 1960; however, further equipment failures culminating in the failure of her steering gear on 3 April forced her to return to Halifax. A hull survey in May found extensive corrosion and cracking, forcing her into drydock for the remainder of the year. She undertook further repairs in June–July 1961 after further cracking was found during operations in heavy seas that March. More cracks were detected in March 1962 which forced a refit through February 1963.

Preservation 

With the writing on the wall, Haida undertook her last assignment, a summer tour of the Great Lakes. She departed Halifax on 25 April 1963 with a mobile television studio on board. She undertook various public tours and weapons training during the tour; one of the individuals to tour her was a former RCN rating named Neil Bruce. Bruce foresaw that she was destined for scrapping and formed HAIDA Inc. with four others as a means of attempting to acquire her for preservation. On 30 April 1963, the ship was paid off for the last time.

Haida returned to Halifax and was placed in Category C reserve at the navy base  in Sydney. Crown Assets announced Haida would be scrapped in 1964 as part of cutbacks to the RCN. HAIDA Inc. placed a bid of $20,000 and won possession on the grounds of restoration. After preparing the ship, the RCN towed the vessel to Marine Industries Limited shipyard at Sorel, Quebec where she became civilian property.

The Naval Reserve Division  provided a skeleton crew for Haida as she was towed to Toronto by two tugboats. She arrived on 25 August 1964 with guest of honour, retired Vice-Admiral Harry DeWolf, who was the destroyer's first commanding officer. Haida was restored and reacquired the pennant G63 while docked at the foot of York Street.

She opened as an attraction in August 1965 at the pier on York Street. Initially the city of Toronto had planned to build a "Serviceman's Memorial Park" near the Princes' Gates at nearby Exhibition Place to link with the Haida preservation efforts. The organization HAIDA Inc. ran into financial difficulties during the late 1960s and title to the ship was transferred to the provincial government for $1. In 1970, Haida was moved to Ontario Place at the west end of the Toronto waterfront, where it was turned into an attraction until 2002. The guns on the vessel were fired whenever the Toronto Symphony played Tchaikovsky's 1812 Overture at the nearby Forum, the outdoor in-the-round concert stage at Ontario Place. The vessel was also used as a Royal Canadian Sea Cadets training facility.

HMCS Haida National Historic Site

In 2002, at the urging of Hamilton, Ontario MP Sheila Copps, Parks Canada purchased Haida from the provincial government and towed her (with great difficulty) from her Ontario Place dock to a shipyard at Port Weller for a $5 million refit to her hull. She was taken to a new home on the Hamilton waterfront and arrived to an 11-gun salute from 31 Royal Canadian Sea Cadet Corps Lion and her 12-pounder naval field gun on 30 August 2003, the 60th anniversary of her commissioning into the RCN. The destroyer is now a National Historic Site and is a museum ship on the Hamilton waterfront in front of Hamilton's Naval Reserve Division, .

In July 2006 Haida was "twinned" with the Polish destroyer Błyskawica in a ceremony in Gdynia, Poland. Both ships served in the 10th Destroyer Flotilla during the Second World War. The ceremony was attended by former crew members of both ships and the general public. The ship was visited in 2009 by Prince Charles, Prince of Wales, and his wife, Camilla, Duchess of Cornwall, and, on June 29, 2010, at Government House in Nova Scotia, Prince Philip, Duke of Edinburgh, presented to representatives of HMCS Haida the World Ship Trust Certificate. In September 2016, the ship was towed to Heddle Marine to undergo repairs and upgrades. The repairs took until December 2016 to complete. In February 2018, Haida was designated the ceremonial flagship of the Canadian Navy, now marked by the hoisting of a Haida tribal flag.

Affiliations and organizations
There is also a Sea Cadet Corps named after the ship, located in Streetsville, Mississauga. 186 Royal Canadian Sea Cadet Corps Haida, was established on 9 January 1963. The museum is affiliated with the Canadian Museums Association, Canadian Heritage Information Network, Organization of Military Museums of Canada and the Virtual Museum of Canada.

See also
 List of attractions in Hamilton, Ontario
 List of museum ships
 Ships preserved in museums

Notes

Citations

References

Further reading

External links

Parks Canada HMCS Haida website
HNSA Web Page: HMCS Haida

Tribal-class destroyers (1936) of the Royal Canadian Navy
World War II destroyers of Canada
Cold War destroyers of Canada
Museum ships in Canada
Museum ships in Ontario
Museums in Hamilton, Ontario
National Historic Sites in Ontario
1942 ships
Korean War destroyers of Canada
Ships built on the River Tyne
Ships built by Vickers Armstrong